A priory is a house of men or women under religious vows headed by a prior or prioress.

Priory may also refer to:

Places
 Priory (Abergavenny ward), an electoral district in Monmouthshire, Wales
 Priory, Pembrokeshire, a location in Wales
 Priory (Trafford ward), electoral district in Manchester, England
 Priory, an electoral ward for the town council in Lewes, East Sussex, England

Arts and culture
 Priory (band), an American rock band
 The Priory (play), a 2009 play by Michael Wynne
 Priory Records, a British record label
 Priory: The Only Home I've Got, a 1978 Canadian documentary film
 The Priory, a Channel 4 television series hosted by Zoe Ball and Jamie Theakston

Buildings
 The Priory, Brighton, England, also known as Gothic House
 The Priory, Burwood, Australia, a heritage-listed residence
 The Priory, Gladesville, Australia, a heritage-listed building
 The Priory, York, England, a pub
 Priory Hospital, a London mental health hospital commonly known as The Priory
 Priory Palace, Gatchina, Russia
 Monmouth Priory, Monmouth, Wales

See also 
 Priory Church (disambiguation)
 Priory School (disambiguation)